Sayan is a village about 5 km (3 mi) west of the town of Ubud, in Bali, Indonesia. It sits on a ridge along the Ayung River.

A photograph of a typical sayan house compound of the past is found in Wijaya's architectural history of Bali

References

External links 
 Photos of the Four Seasons Resort at Sayan

Populated places in Bali